The Stanford Cardinal football program represents Stanford University in the Pac-12 Conference. The Cardinal competes as part of the National Collegiate Athletic Association (NCAA) Division I Football Bowl Subdivision. The team has had 31 head coaches since its founding in 1892.

The Cardinal have played in 1,207 games of American football in 112 seasons. In their first season, the team played 4 games with no head coach. From 1906 to 1917, Stanford replaced football with rugby.  The school did not field teams in 1918 and from 1943 to 1945 due to World War I and World War II, respectively.

Conference championships have been won by Pop Warner, Claude E. Thornhill, Clark Shaughnessy, Chuck Taylor, John Ralston, Bill Walsh, Tyrone Willingham, and David Shaw. Shaw is the all-time leader in games coached and most victories. James F. Lanagan is the leader in win percentage for coaches with more than one season of service.

Of the 31 Stanford head coaches, six—Walter Camp, Fielding H. Yost, Andrew Kerr, Warner, Shaughnessy, and Ralston—have been inducted in the College Football Hall of Fame as coaches. Four more—George H. Brooke (who played at Swarthmore),  Marchmont Schwartz (who played at Notre Dame), Taylor (who played at Stanford) and Paul Wiggin (who also played at Stanford)—are in the Hall of Fame as players.

Stanford's head coach position is currently vacant.  David Shaw, who was Pac-12 Coach of the Year in 2011, 2012, 2015, and 2017, was the most recent head coach, resigning on November 27, 2022.

On November 18, 2017, David Shaw won his 72nd game to become Stanford's winningest coach with a 17–14 win over Cal in the 120th Big Game.  He surpassed Pop Warner, who amassed 71 victories in the years 1924–1932.

Key

Coaches

Notes

References 
General

 
 

Specific

Stanford

Cardinal football
Stanford Cardinal football